Todd Thurston Semonite (born May 29, 1957) was the 54th chief of engineers of the United States Army and the commanding general of the U.S. Army Corps of Engineers (USACE). Semonite graduated from the United States Military Academy with a Bachelor of Science degree in civil engineering and was commissioned into the Army Corps of Engineers in 1979. He also holds a Master of Science degree from the University of Vermont and a Master of Military Art and Science from the U.S. Army Command and General Staff College.

In January 2020, Scott A. Spellmon was nominated to succeed Semonite as the 55th Chief of Engineers.

U.S.-Mexico border wall
During a September 2019 visit to a new section of border wall near San Diego, President Donald Trump said the wall was "wired so that we will know if somebody’s trying to break through." When Trump was asked to provide reporters with further details, Semonite cautioned him, "Sir, there could be some merit in not discussing that."

2020 COVID-19 pandemic response
In March 2020, Semonite gave the Pentagon briefing on how the US military would initiate and lead an effort to lease a large number of facilities nationwide in hotels and in larger open buildings to increase the number of rooms and beds with ICU capability for the COVID-19 pandemic. USACE handles leasing and engineering, with contracts for rapid facility modification and setup to local contractors. The plan envisions that the facilities' operation and the provision of medical staff will be handled entirely by the various states rather than the federal government.

References

External links

1957 births
Living people
United States Military Academy alumni
United States Army Corps of Engineers personnel
University of Vermont alumni
United States Army Command and General Staff College alumni
United States Army generals
United States Army Corps of Engineers Chiefs of Engineers
COVID-19 pandemic in the United States